Volkan Bozkır (born 22 November 1950, Ankara) is a Turkish diplomat and politician who served as the President of the United Nations General Assembly from 2020 to 2021. He served as Minister for European Union Affairs from November 2015 to May 2016 and previously held the same office from August 2014 to August 2015. He concurrently served as the Chief Negotiator for Turkish Accession to the European Union during the same time.

He was elected as the president of The United Nations General Assembly on 17 June 2020 for the 75th session, becoming the first-ever Turkish diplomat to hold this position.

Early life and education
Volkan Bozkır was born in Ankara, Turkey. He graduated from Faculty of Law at the Ankara University. He speaks fluent English and French.

Career 
He has served as a Member of Parliament for İstanbul's second electoral district since the 2011 general election. Volkan Bozkır is a career diplomat and a defendant of the Turkish position regarding the Armenian genocide but also its anti-terror laws. While being the Turkish Minister for the European Union (EU) and also the leading negotiator in the Turkish accession talks to the EU denied there existed an Armenian genocide. After the EU issued a draft for the Turkey progress report in 2015 including a demand that Turkey accepts that there existed an Armenian genocide, he declared that Turkey wouldn't answer an EU report containing the term genocide. Also in 2015, he criticized Pope Francis for including the term Genocide in a sermon he held in a mass at the St. Peter's Basilica in Rome. As the EU demanded that Turkey adapts its anti-terror regulations according to EU normatives. Bozkır opposed the demand stating the anti terror laws regulations are already in line with the EU demands. As the EU Parliament voted for the accession talks to be suspended in march 2019, Bozkır, as the head of committee for foreign affairs in the Grand National Assembly of Turkey condemned the vote.

On the 17 June 2020, he was elected as the president of the 75th General Assembly of the United Nations, which is to take place September 2020 as the sole candidate with unanimous support from the 178 UN member states that were present in voting that was conducted by secret ballot. Armenia, Greece and Cyprus, while initially supportive, decided later to oppose the candidacy, allegedly due to diplomatic conflicts.

Timeline of career

Honours and medals

Criticism 
Bozkır caused controversy in 2014 when he reported during a press conference that Turkey would no longer participate in the Eurovision Song Contest after Conchita Wurst's victory in Eurovision Song Contest 2014. On September 5 the General Manager of TRT, İbrahim Şahin, officially announced that Turkey would not return to Eurovision Song Contest 2015 in Vienna. Bozkır's comments during the press conference included "Each time I look at the Austrian who won the Eurovision Song Contest, I say 'Thankfully, we're not participating in this contest anymore.'"

Pakistan, in May 2021, conferred its second highest civilian award Hilal-e-Pakistan to Volkan Bozkir when he was the visiting UN General Assembly President. During his visit to Pakistan, Volkan Bozkir said that it was Pakistan's duty to raise the Jammu and Kashmir dispute in the United Nations "more strongly" and also that there was a lack of political will to find a resolution to the Kashmir dispute compared to the Palestinian issue, even though both have been festering for an equally long period." A day later, the Ministry of External Affairs of India expressed strong opposition to Bozkir's remarks stating that "When an incumbent President of the UN General Assembly makes misleading and prejudiced remarks, he does great disservice to the office he occupies. The PGA's behaviour is truly regrettable and surely diminishes his standing on the global platform,"

References

1950 births
Living people
Turkish Muslims
Justice and Development Party (Turkey) politicians
Ambassadors of Turkey to the European Union
Ambassadors of Turkey to Romania
Deniers of the Armenian genocide
Deputies of Istanbul
Members of the 24th Parliament of Turkey
Members of the 25th Parliament of Turkey
Members of the 26th Parliament of Turkey
Members of the 64th government of Turkey
Ministers of European Union Affairs of Turkey
Recipients of the Order of the Star of Romania
Recipients of the Order of Merit of the Italian Republic
20th-century Turkish diplomats
Presidents of the United Nations General Assembly
Recipients of Hilal-i-Pakistan